Alan Joaquín Espeche (born 4 September 1999) is an Argentine professional footballer who plays as a midfielder for Los Andes, on loan from All Boys.

Career
Espeche began his career with All Boys. He was selected for his professional debut on 14 April 2018, with the midfielder starting a goalless draw at home to Gimnasia y Esgrima in the 2017–18 Primera B Nacional; which concluded with relegation. Espeche scored for the first time in Primera B Metropolitana, netting the sole goal in a win away to Deportivo Riestra on 8 April 2019. In January 2022, Espeche joined Los Andes on a one-year loan deal with a purchase option.

Career statistics
.

References

External links

1999 births
Living people
Sportspeople from Buenos Aires Province
Argentine footballers
Association football midfielders
Primera Nacional players
Primera B Metropolitana players
All Boys footballers
Club Atlético Los Andes footballers